Richard Stephens (born December 8, 1947 in Port Perry, Ontario) is a Canadian former pair skater.  With partner Anna Forder, he competed in the 1968 Winter Olympics and won the gold medal at the Canadian Figure Skating Championships the next year.

Results
pairs with Anna Forder

References

1947 births
Canadian male pair skaters
Figure skaters at the 1968 Winter Olympics
Olympic figure skaters of Canada
Living people
People from Scugog